Boeremia lycopersici (syn. Didymella lycopersici) is a fungal plant pathogen infecting tomatoes and strawberries.

References

External links 
 Index Fungorum
 USDA ARS Fungal Database

Pleosporales
Fungal plant pathogens and diseases
Tomato diseases
Fungal strawberry diseases
Fungi described in 1881